The 1945 Svenska Cupen final took place on 26 August 1945 at Råsunda in Solna. It was contested between Allsvenskan sides IFK Norrköping and Malmö FF. The final was a repeat of last years final which Malmö FF won 4–3 after extra time. IFK Norrköping played their third final in total and Malmö FF played their second final in total. IFK Norrköping won their second title with a 4–1 victory.

Match details

External links
Svenska Cupen at svenskfotboll.se

1945
Cup
Malmö FF matches
IFK Norrköping matches
Football in Stockholm
August 1945 sports events in Europe